Modern China Studies (traditional Chinese: 當代中國研究; simplified Chinese: 当代中国研究), abbreviated as MCS,  also translated into English as Contemporary China Studies,  is a United States-based peer-reviewed international journal focusing on discussing contemporary issues and current affairs in the People's Republic of China,  published biannually featuring articles in either Chinese or English. It is owned and  published by the Center on Contemporary China (当代中国研究中心) at Princeton University.

Modern China Studies was founded by Li Shaomin (李少民) in 1990 in Princeton University, its content mainly covers the fields of politics, economy, law, society, culture, international relations, environmental protection, modern history and humanities. Submissions to the journal will undergo a double-blind peer-review process.

References 

Princeton University publications
Chinese studies journals
English-language journals
Publications established in 1990